William Alexander Cunningham (July 9, 1886 – August 15, 1968) was an American football and basketball coach.  He served as the head football coach at the University of Georgia from 1910 to 1919, compiling a career college football record of 43-18-9.  Cunningham was also the head basketball coach at Georgia (1910–1911, 1916–1917), tallying a mark of 10–6.

Coaching career
Cunningham was the 14th head football coach at the University of Georgia and brought both continuity and success to the team.  In the 18 years of the Georgia Bulldogs football program at prior to his arrival, the team had 13 different head coaches with no head coach serving for more than three years.  Cunningham was a graduate of Vanderbilt University and gained football experience under longtime Vanderbilt Commodores football head coach Dan McGugin.  Cunningham was an active member of the Sigma Chi fraternity's Alpha Psi chapter as an undergraduate at Vanderbilt and the Delta chapter at Georgia during law school.  He was a faculty advisor for the Delta chapter during his coaching career at Georgia.

Cunningham came to the attention of Steadman Vincent Sanford, then the athletic director at Georgia, when the baseball team that Cunningham was coaching, Gordon Military Institute, was playing at the Bulldogs.  Sanford had a conversation with Cunningham and presented him with a $1,350 contract on the spot. Bob McWhorter followed his coach to Georgia.

During Cunningham's ten-year tenure as head football coach at Georgia, the Bulldogs only played eight seasons, disbanding the team in 1917 and 1918 as a result of World War I, but his teams produced seven winning seasons, two more than in the first 18 years of the program's history before Cunningham took the reins.  Cunningham compiled a 43–18–9 coaching record at Georgia.  He also coached Georgia's first All-American, McWhorter, and George "Kid" Woodruff, who assumed the head coaching duties at Georgia in 1923.

During the hiatus of Georgia football in 1917 and 1918, Cunningham joined the United States Army.  He returned to coaching in 1919 for one year, then re-enlisted in the Army.  Cunningham reached the rank of general in the Army.  He also served in World War II with the, achieving the rank of colonel. Cunningham  died on August 15, 1968, and was buried in the Marietta National Cemetery in Marietta, Georgia. Cunningham's grandson was Atlanta musician Bruce Hampton.

Head coaching record

Football

References

 Reed, Thomas Walter (1949). Athens, Georgia: University of Georgia Press. History of the University of Georgia; Chapter XVII: Athletics at the University from the Beginning Through 1947 imprint pages 3500-3531

External links
 

1886 births
1958 deaths
American football ends
Georgia Bulldogs basketball coaches
Georgia Bulldogs football coaches
Vanderbilt Commodores football players
United States Army personnel of World War I
United States Army personnel of World War II
Players of American football from Nashville, Tennessee
United States Army colonels